Mały Płock  is a village in Kolno County, Podlaskie Voivodeship, in north-eastern Poland. It is the seat of the gmina (administrative district) called Gmina Mały Płock.

The village has a population of 1,051.

References

Villages in Kolno County
Łomża Governorate
Białystok Voivodeship (1919–1939)
Warsaw Voivodeship (1919–1939)
Belastok Region